The Garte is a small tributary to the Leine River in Lower Saxony, Germany.

Towns that it runs through or by include Beienrode, Kerstlingerode, Rittmarshausen (where it is joined by the Bernsroder Bach), Wöllmarshausen, Benniehausen (where the Bischhäuser Bach joins it),  Klein Lengden (where the Bramke and Eichbach join it), and Diemarden. The stream joins the Leine River south of Göttingen. With a drop of 151 m, the stream averages a bed slope of 6.6‰. It is classified as a third-order (i.e., lowest) stream according to the German system of body-of-water ranking.

The river valley is considered locally as something of a micro-cultural unit, especially solidified by the now-defunct Garte Valley Railway, a 750 mm narrow-gauge railway running from Göttingen to Duderstadt.

Tributaries 
from source to mouth
 (unnamed stream, from Weißenborn) (L)
 Glasehauser Bach (R)
 Moosgrund (L)
 Bernsroder Bach (R)
 Bischhäuser Bach (L)
 Bramke (R)
 Lengder Bach (R)
 Eichbach (R)

See also 
List of rivers of Lower Saxony

References 

Rivers of Lower Saxony
Rivers of Germany